Homer High School is a senior high school in Homer, Louisiana, United States and a part of the Claiborne Parish School Board.

Athletics
Homer High athletics competes in the LHSAA.

Championships
Football championships
(5) State Championships: 1923, 1928, 1937, 1939, 2021

In the 2021 1A state championship game, Homer defeated Logansport 37–21 at the Caesars Superdome in New Orleans.

Band
In 2011, the school district closed Homer High's band program as one of several measures to reduce the district budget by $2.4 million.

References

External links
 Homer High School
 

Public high schools in Louisiana
Schools in Claiborne Parish, Louisiana